7529 Vagnozzi, provisional designation , is a stony asteroid from the inner regions of the asteroid belt, approximately 5 kilometers in diameter. It was discovered on 16 January 1994, by and at the Colleverde Observatory near Rome, Italy. The asteroid was named for was named for Italian amateur astronomer Antonio Vagnozzi.

Orbit and classification 

Vagnozzi orbits the Sun in the inner main-belt at a distance of 2.2–2.7 AU once every 3 years and 10 months (1,407 days). Its orbit has an eccentricity of 0.12 and an inclination of 4° with respect to the ecliptic.
The first used observation was taken at the Australian Siding Spring Observatory in 1988, extending the asteroid's observation arc by 6 years prior to its official discovery.

Physical characteristics

Rotation period 

In August 2011, a tentative rotational lightcurve for Vagnozzi was obtained from photometric observations by French amateur astronomer René Roy.

Diameter and albedo 

According to the survey carried out by the NEOWISE mission of NASA's Wide-field Infrared Survey Explorer, Vagnozzi measures 4.9 kilometers in diameter and its surface has an albedo of 0.29, while the Collaborative Asteroid Lightcurve Link assumes a standard albedo for stony asteroids of 0.20 and calculates a diameter of 5.7 kilometers with an absolute magnitude of 13.6.

Naming 

This minor planet was named in honor of Antonio Vagnozzi (born 1950), an Italian amateur astronomer, discoverer of minor planets, and pioneer in using CCD cameras at the Santa Lucia Stroncone Astronomical Observatory in Italy. He is also an observer and discoverer of supernovae. The official naming citation was published by the Minor Planet Center on 11 April 1998.

References

External links 
 Asteroid Lightcurve Database (LCDB), query form (info )
 Dictionary of Minor Planet Names, Google books
 Asteroids and comets rotation curves, CdR – Observatoire de Genève, Raoul Behrend
 Discovery Circumstances: Numbered Minor Planets (5001)-(10000) – Minor Planet Center
 
 

007529
Named minor planets
19940116